Die Sammlung (German for "The Collection") was a monthly literary magazine, first published in September 1933 in Amsterdam, and primarily affiliated with a number of influential German writers who fled from the Hitler regime during the first years of the establishment and consolidation of Nazi rule.

The magazine was primarily organized by writer Klaus Mann and Dutch publisher Querido Verlag's Emanuel Querido and Fritz Landshoff. Mann served as editor from 1933 to 1935; Die Sammlung'''s activity ceased with his departure in August 1935, and Mann left Europe for the United States.

Although published in the German language, Die Sammlung was intended to be an international literary magazine. Besides featuring notable writers from the international community of German exiles around the world, it included the work of non-German writers, such as the English novelist Aldous Huxley and French writer Jean Cocteau.
Writers for Die Sammlung
Johannes R. Becher
Sybille Bedford
Félix Bertaux 
Ernst Bloch
Bertolt Brecht
Max Brod
Jean Cocteau
Alfred Döblin  
Ilja Ehrenburg 
Albert Einstein 
Lion Feuchtwanger
Bruno Frank 
A.M. Frey 
André Gide
Oskar Maria Graf 
Thomas Theodor Heine 
Ernest Hemingway
Stefan Heym 
Aldous Huxley  
Heinrich Eduard Jacob
Alfred Kantorowicz  
Alfred Kerr 
Hermann Kesten 
Else Lasker-Schüler 
Golo Mann 
Heinrich Mann 
André Maurois
Walter Mehring  
Walther Rode
Joseph Roth
Ernst Toller
Leon Trotski
Jakob Wassermann 
F.C. Weiskopf 
Arnold Zweig 
Hermynia zur Mühlen

LiteratureDie Sammlung: Een bloemlezing uit het emigranten-maandblad dat van september 1933 tot augustus 1935 onder redactie van Klaus Mann bij Querido Verlag is verschenen, gekozen door Gerda Meijerink met een inleiding van F.H. Landshoff. Querido, Amsterdam, 1983. 
 Günter Hartung: Klaus Manns Zeitschrift "Die Sammlung" (Teil I). In: Weimarer Beiträge nr. 5, 1973, p. 37–59.
 Ulrike Spring: Verlagstätigkeit im niederländischen Exil 1933-1940. Diplomarbeit Universität Wien, 1994,. p. 25 e.v. 
 Angela Huß-Michel: Literarische und politische Zeitschriften des Exils. Metzler, Stuttgart, 1987.  /  
 Uwe Naumann: Ruhe gibt es nicht, bis zum Schluß. Klaus Mann (1906-1949). Bilder und Dokumente''. Rowohlt, Reinbek, 2001, 

1933 establishments in the Netherlands
1935 disestablishments in the Netherlands
Defunct literary magazines published in Europe
Defunct magazines published in the Netherlands
Exilliteratur
German-language magazines
Literary magazines published in the Netherlands
Magazines established in 1933
Magazines disestablished in 1935
Magazines published in Amsterdam
Monthly magazines published in the Netherlands